Justice Hanson may refer to:

Charles S. Hanson, associate justice of the South Dakota Supreme Court
Ephraim Hanson, associate justice of the Utah Supreme Court
George M. Hanson, associate justice of the Maine Supreme Judicial Court
Sam Hanson, associate justice of the Minnesota Supreme Court

See also
Justice Hansen (disambiguation)